Funa Tonaki  (渡名喜 風南  Tonaki Fūna, born 1 August 1995) is a Japanese judoka. She won a silver medal in Women's Judo 48 kg, at the 2020 Summer Olympics held in Tokyo, Japan.

Career
In 2015, she won the gold medal at the World Junior Championships in Abu Dhabi. She won the gold medal at the 2017 World Judo Championships in Budapest by defeating top seed Galbadrakhyn Otgontsetseg in the semi-final and former world champion Mönkhbatyn Urantsetseg in the final.

In 2021, she won the silver medal in her event at the 2021 Judo World Masters held in Doha, Qatar

References

External links

 
 
 

1995 births
Living people
Japanese female judoka
World judo champions
Universiade gold medalists for Japan
Universiade bronze medalists for Japan
Universiade medalists in judo
Medalists at the 2015 Summer Universiade
Olympic judoka of Japan
Judoka at the 2020 Summer Olympics
Olympic silver medalists for Japan
Olympic medalists in judo
Medalists at the 2020 Summer Olympics
People from Sagamihara
21st-century Japanese women